Alga, Burkina Faso is a town in the Bourzanga Department of Bam Province in northern Burkina Faso. It has a population of 1,328.

References

Populated places in the Centre-Nord Region
Bam Province